Millan or Millán is both a surname and a given name. Notable people with the name include:

Surname:
Agustín Millán (born 1958), Spanish handball player
Alejandro Millán (born 1980), Mexican musician
Amy Millan (born 1973), Canadian singer and musician
Bruce Millan (1927–2013), Scottish politician
Cesar Millan (born 1969), Mexican dog trainer
Donald Millan (born 1986), Colombian footballer
Félix Millán (born 1943), Puerto Rican baseball player
Gonzalo Millán (1947–2006), Chilean writer and poet
Gregorio Millán (1919–2004), Spanish aeronautical engineer and professor
Juan Millán (born 1994), Spanish footballer
Kieran Millan (born 1989), Canadian ice hockey player
Laura Huertas Millán (born 1983), Colombian-French artist and film-maker
Millán Millán, environmental scientist
Natalia Millan (born 1969), Spanish actress
Nicolás Millán (born 1991), Chilean footballer
Scott Millan (born 1954), American audio engineer
Victor Millan (1920–2009), American actor and academic

Given name:
Millan Baçi (born 1955), Albanian footballer
Millán Millán